Old Delhi or Purani Dilli is an area in the Central Delhi district of Delhi, India. It was founded as a walled city named Shahjahanabad in 1648, when Shah Jahan (the Mughal emperor at the time) decided to shift the Mughal capital from Agra. The construction of the city was completed in 1648, and it remained the capital of the Mughal Empire until its fall in 1857, when the British Raj took over as paramount power in India.
It was once filled with mansions of nobles and members of the royal court, along with elegant mosques and gardens. 

It serves as the symbolic heart of metropolitan Delhi and is known for its bazaars, street food, shopping locations and its Islamic architecture; Jama Masjid being the most notable example, standing tall in the midst of the old city. Only a few havelis are left and maintained.

Upon the 2012 trifurcation of the Municipal Corporation of Delhi, Old Delhi became administered by the North Delhi Municipal Corporation

History

Delhi Sultanate era 
The site of Shahjahanabad is north of earlier settlements of Delhi. Its southern part overlaps some of the area that was settled by the Tughlaqs in the 14th century when it was the seat of Delhi Sultanate. The sultanates ruled from Delhi between 1206 and 1526, when the last was replaced by the Mughal dynasty.  The five dynasties were the Mamluk dynasty (1206–90), the Khalji dynasty (1290–1320), the Tughlaq dynasty (1320–1414), the Sayyid dynasty (1414–51),  Lodi dynasty (1451–1526) and the Suri dynasty (1540-1556)

Mughal era 
Delhi remained an important place for the Mughals, who built palaces and forts. Most importantly, Shah Jahan had the walled city built from 1638 to 1649, containing the Lal Qila and the Chandni Chowk. Delhi was one of the original twelve subahs (imperial Mughal provinces), renamed Shahjahanabad in 1648, bordering Awadh, Agra, Ajmer, Multan and Lahore subahs. Daryaganj had the original cantonment of Delhi, after 1803, where a native regiment of Delhi garrison was stationed, which was later shifted to Ridge area.  East of Daryaganj was Raj ghat Gate of the walled city, opening at Raj Ghat on Yamuna River. The first wholesale market of Old Delhi opened as the hardware market in Chawri Bazaar in 1840, the next wholesale market was that of dry fruits, spices and herbs at Khari Baoli, opening in 1850. The Phool Mandi (Flower Market) of Daryaganj was established in 1869, and even today, despite serving a small geographical area, it is of great importance due to dense population.

Colonial era 

After the fall of the Mughal Empire post 1857 revolt, the British Raj shifted the capital of British controlled territories in India to a less volatile city, Calcutta in Bengal, where it remained until 1911. After the announcement of the change, the British developed Lutyens' Delhi (in modern New Delhi) just south-west of Shahjahanabad. At this point, the older city started being called Old Delhi, as New Delhi became the seat of a national government. It was formally inaugurated as such in 1931.

1876 description 
In 1876, Carr Stephen described the city as follows:

Of the two streets described by François Bernier, the longer extended from the Lahore Gate of the city to the Lahore Gate of the citadel, and the other from the Delhi Gate of the city to the Lahore Gate of the fort. Both these streets were divided into several sections, each of which was known by a different name.

The section between the Lahore Gate of the fort and the entrance of the street called the Dariba, known as the Khuni Darwazah, was called the Urdu or the Military Bazaar; owing, very probably, to the circumstances of a portion of the local garrison having been once quartered about the place. Between the Khuni Darwazah and the present Kotwali, or the Head Police Station of the city, the street has the name of Phul ka Mandi or the flower market. The houses in front of the Kotwali were built at a short distance from the line of the rest of the houses in the street, to form a square.

Between the Kotwali and the gate known as the Taraiah, was the Jauhari or the Jewellers' Bazaar; between the Taraiah and the neighborhood known as Asharfi ka Katra, was, par excellence, the Chandni Chowk. There was a tank in the center of the Chowk the site of which is now occupied by the Municipal Clock Tower, and beyond this to the Fatehpuri Masjid was the Fatehpuri Bazaar. The houses around Chandni Chowk were of the same height, and were ornamented with arched doors and painted verandahs. To the north and south of the square, there were two gateways, the former leading to the Sarai of Jehan Ara Begum, and the latter to one of the most thickly populated quarters of the city. Round the tank, the ground was covered with vegetable, fruit, and sweetmeat stalls. Over time the whole of this long street came to be known as the Chandni Chauk.

This grand street was laid out by Jahanara Begum, daughter of Shah Jahan. From the Lahore Gate of the fort to the end of the Chandni Chauk the street was about 40 yards wide and 1,520 yards long. Through the center of this street ran the canal of 'Ali Mardan, shaded on both sides by trees. On the eastern end of the Chandni Chauk stands the Lahore Gate of the Fort and on the opposite end the handsome mosque of Fatehpuri Begam.

The clock tower no longer exists, although the location is still called Ghantaghar. The Sarai of Jehan Ara Begum has been replaced by the city hall. The kotwal is now adjacent to Gurdwara Sis Ganj Sahib.

Demographics 
After the construction of the city, many people from Rajasthan, Awadh, Haryana, Punjab, Western Uttar Pradesh, Uttarakhand, Himachal Pradesh, Jammu and Kashmir arrived for job opportunities and better living standards. The population of Old Delhi remains a mix of many different ethnic groups from the Indian subcontinent. While most areas are Muslim-dominated, Hindi is the most spoken language.

Walls and gates 

It is approximately shaped like a quarter cìrcle, with the Red Fort as the focal point.
 Nigambodh Gate: northeast, leading to historic Nigambodh Ghat on the Yamuna River
 Kashmiri Gate: north
 Mori Gate: north
 Kabuli gate: west
 Lahori gate: west close to the Sadar Railway station, Railway Colony, including the tomb of Syed Abdul Rehman Jilani Dehlvi.
 Ajmeri Gate: southwest, leading to Ghaziuddin Khan's Madrassa and Connaught Place, a focal point in New Delhi
 Turkman Gate: southwest, close to some pre-Shahjahan remains which got enclosed within the walls, including the tomb of Shah Turkman Bayabani.
 Delhi Gate: south leading to Feroz Shah Kotla and what was then older habitation of Delhi.

In the Mughal period, the gates were kept locked at night.
The walls have now largely disappeared, but most of the gates are still present. The township of old Delhi is still identifiable in a satellite image because of the density of houses.

The Khooni Darwaza, south of Delhi Gate and just outside the walled city, was originally constructed by Sher Shah Suri.

Streets and neighbourhoods

The main street, now termed Chandni Chowk, runs from the Red Fort to Fatehpuri Masjid. Originally a canal ran through the middle of the street.

North of the street, there is the mansion of Begum Samru, now called Bhagirath Palace.
South of the street is Dariba Kalan, a dense residential area, beyond which is Jama Masjid. Daryaganj is a section that used to border the river at Rajghat and Zeenat-ul-Masjid.

The Urdu language emerged from the Urdu Bazaar section of Old Delhi. The Din Dunia magazine and various other Urdu publications are the reason for this language staying alive.

Its main arteries are
 Netaji Subhash Marg / Bahadur Shah Zafar Marg leading to India Gate (north and south)
 Chandni Chowk/Khari Bawli Road (east and west)

Old Delhi is approximately bounded by these modern roads:
 Nicholson Road (north)
 Mahatma Gandhi Marg (east)
 Shraddhananda Marg (west)
 Jawaharlal Nehru Marg (south)

In literature

The engraving accompanying Letitia Elizabeth Landon's poem The City of Delhi, appears to show the Jama Masjid with an elephant on the open ground before it. She associates the city's past glories with tales of enchantment, namely James Ridley's The Tales of the Genii (Sir Charles Mansell).

Historical sites 

Many of the historical attractions are in the Chandni Chowk area and the Red Fort. In addition, Old Delhi also has:
Gurudwara Sis Ganj Sahib, a sikh Gurudwara built to commemorate the martyrdom site of the ninth Sikh Guru, Guru Tegh Bahadur. It marks the site where the ninth Sikh Guru was beheaded on the orders of the Mughal emperor Aurangzeb on 11 November 1675 for rebelling against the forceful conversion of people from other religions (Hindus, Sikhs, Jains) to Islam.
 Gaurishankar Temple
 Salimgarh Fort
 Mumtaz Mahal
 Gali Qasim Jan in Ballimaran is the site of Mirza Ghalib's haveli, and that of Hakim Ajmal Khan
 Razia Sultana's tomb near Kalan Masjid
 Jama Masjid, India's largest mosque
 Lal Mandir, Delhi's oldest Jain temple
 Fatehpuri Masjid
 Khari Baoli, Asia's biggest spice market
 Zinat-ul Masjid, Daryaganj built-in 1710 by one of Aurangzeb's daughters
 Rajghat, Mahatma Gandhi's cremation site memorial
 St. James Church (near Kashmiri Gate) built-in 1836, Delhi's oldest church, built by Col. James Skinner.

Some of the historical mansions include:
 Begum Samru's Palace of 1806 (see )now called Bhagirath Palace.
 Naughara mansions in Kinari Bazaar, 18th-century Jain mansions.
 Khazanchi haveli
 Haveli Raja Jugal Kishore
 Masterji Kee Haveli, Sita Ram Bazar 
 Haveli Sharif Manzil in Ballimaran is famous for its Aristocratic Hakims and their Unani practice, and that of Hakim Ajmal Khan
 Haveli of Mirza Ghalib, Gali Qasim Jan that is in Ballimaran
 Chunnamal haveli, Katra Neel
 Haveli of Zeenat Mahal, Lal Kuan Bazar
 Haksar Haveli, Bazar Sitaram, where Jawaharlal Nehru was married in 1916 to Kamla Nehru.
 Haveli Naharwali, Kucha Sadullah Khan, where Pervez Musharraf, former president of Pakistan was born
 Kucha Chelan (Kucha Chehle Ameeran), where the Persian descent inhabited
 Gurdwara Sis Ganj Sahib. Place where 9th Sikh Guru Guru Tegh Bahadur was executed.

Old Delhi cuisine

Old Delhi is well known for its cuisine.  Karim's, a restaurant described as the city's most famous culinary destination, is near the Jama Masjid. The Gali Paranthe Wali and Ghantewala halwai are also situated here. Chawri Bazaar is one of the oldest markets in Delhi, dating back to the 17th century and was before known as a hardware market, but is known nowadays for its wholesale paper products.

Old Delhi is also known for its street food. Chandni Chowk and Chawri Bazaar areas have many street joints that sell spicy chaat (tangy and spicy snacks).

Culinary history 

Old Delhi has certain identifiable landmarks of food. These include:

Paranthe Wali Gali 
Pandit Gaya Prasad shifted from Agra to Delhi in 1876, in search of a better life. In Delhi, he set up a single shop business selling hot paranthas. The product gained popularity to an extent that he required the aid of his family members for help in the production. Eventually, Paranthe wali Gali, the lane in which the original shop was came to house 16 of them. It is now run by the families of Pandit Gaya Prasad and his relatives. The sixth-generation continues to run four of the sixteen original shops that remain.

Karim's 
Having been in the business of catering to Mughal Emperors, the family that runs it was displaced following the Revolt of 1857. In 1911, Haji Karimuddin moved back to Delhi with inspiration to open a Dhaba to cater to people coming to witness the coronation from all across the country. It was in 1913 that he established the Karim Hotel in Gali Kababian, Jama Masjid. Karim's exists here today to cater to the wants of people from all over the country and the world, being a major tourist attraction.

Kallu Nihari
Nihari is a traditional meat stew that is slowly cooked to preserve its taste and the tenderness of its ingredients. Kallu Nihari is a shop in Old Delhi that has served the dish exclusively since it was opened by the late Mohammed Rafiquddin (better known as Kallu Mian) in 1990. The shop, which is well known in the area, has served millions of portions.

Harnarains 
Harnarain Gokalchand was a pickle and murabba shop that was originally established in Khari Baoli by the name Harnarain Gopinath in 1857. It is often considered to be one of India's first commercially available pickle brands and was at the time India's largest food preservers. Their pickles and sharbat have been a household delicacy for over a century and a half, and have even served Jawaharlal Nehru and Indira Gandhi. Having started from a small shop in Khari Baoli, Old Delhi, it has now become a global brand that goes by the name Harnarains International.

Banta 
Characterised by a codd-neck bottle, Banta is a drink that has survived in Old Delhi since 1872. The glass bottle in which this comes has a marble stopper, which is pushed into the bulbous neck of the bottle to unseal it. Engineer Hiram Codd patented the design of the bottle in 1872 in London to effectively seal fizzy drinks.

The Banta bottles even contributed to the Indian National movement. This was so as protestors and rioters would often use these bottles as improvised cannons by adding calcium hydroxide to the mix. Thus, the bottles were banned in many cities across the country at some point before 1947.

Giani di Hatti 
Located on Church Mission Road in the busy Fatehpuri Market of Old Delhi, Giani di Hatti was started by Giani Gurcharan Singh in 1951. Following partition, Giani Gurcharan Singh migrated from Layalpur, now in Pakistan, to Delhi. He came while leaving an eatery there to start one here.

Arriving with his recipe for iced rabdi falooda, large crowds still flock to the shop to get a taste of that unique flavor. Apart from this, the shop also sells various fruit juices and an assortment of main dishes, not to mention over 50 flavors of ice cream.

Change in times can be recorded just by studying this shop as the same rabri falooda that was sold for 4 annas in 1951 is today sold for 80 Rupees.

The third generation of the family looks after the establishment now, which remains popular as ever, with visitors coming all the way to the market just to eat here. It's a great place.

Moti Mahal 

Moti Mahal was founded by Kundan Lal Gujral, Thakur Dass and Kundan Lal Jaggi, in Delhi in 1947. Initially, they worked at a small eatery called Moti Mahal, owned by a man named 'Mokha Singh' in Peshawar, British India, from 1920s to 1947.Moti Mahal was the first to dig up a tandoor right in the middle of the eatery and since then Peshawar was introduced to the culinary art of tandoori chicken by them. This was a success and soon there was in demand for Tandoori Chicken at social gatherings and wedding feasts where they would use an improvised tandoor.

Kundan Lal Jaggi, Kundan Lal Gujral and Thakur Dass, the founders of the restaurant, are credited with the invention of the dish. After the partition of India in 1947, they fled to Delhi with their family. In Delhi, the three partners bought a thara (booth) in Daryaganj area, then considered a newer part of Old Delhi and then they started Moti Mahal, Daryaganj Moti Mahal further went on to invent butter chicken and dal makhani. This brought about a revolution in taste and a place on the International Gourmet Map. Thus was born the Moti Mahal Restaurant, which contributed significantly to putting India on the food map of the world. Indian leaders like Jawaharlal Nehru, Indira Gandhi, Zakir Hussain among various foreign dignitaries like Richard Nixon, John F. Kennedy, Mohammad Reza Pahlavi and the Delahousse family.

Old Famous Jalebi Wala

This jalebi shop in Old Delhi, aptly named, 'Old Famous Jalebi Wala', has been around since 1884; having been in operation for the past four generations of the family now. The jalebi shop was established by Late Sh. Lala Nem Chand Jain in the year 1884. He was a native of Agra's Hari Ki Garhi village. He migrated to Delhi with just INR 2 in his pocket that he got as a dowry in his marriage and opened a shop with that money. He experimented with many recipes before finally making and selling the jalebis that have such a fan following now. It is his secret recipe that is followed until today. This Chandni Chowk based shop has piping hot, thick and juicy, freshly made jalebis that they offer. Their USP is that they use desi khandsari sugar for making the syrup instead of regular sugar, and the jalebis are prepared using desi ghee, cooked over coal-fire. The view of the jalebis being made is a visual delight as it is done live right in front in a small shop at the corner of Dariba Kalan Road.

Economic structure
Old Delhi has markets running through its streets. The area is vast and multiple products are being sold. Most of them are wholesale sellers and have been selling their products for many years. One such business is Gulab Singh Johrimal was established in Dariba Kalan in 1816 mainly as an attar (perfume) manufacturing business.  Since then they have diversified into compounding, incense and toilet soap manufacture.  Their retail outlet in Chandni Chowk was started later on. Another such shop is Harnarains manufacturers of pickles and preserves, located in Khari Baoli.  Under operation since 1944, it is one of the older shops currently located in Old Delhi.  Some migrants sell products like clothes, fruits etc.  The sellers of one product often form an association to serve their interests and negotiate with the local government and other official bodies.  The Old Delhi area and its markets are governed by the Municipal Corporation of Delhi (MCD).

See also 
 History of Delhi
 Timeline of Delhi
 List of tourist attractions in Delhi

Further reading 
 Delhi, the emperor's city: rediscovering Chandni Chowk and its environs, by Vijay Goel. Lustre Press, 2003. .

References

Footnotes

External links 

Old Delhi dictionary and introduction to the names of places
 Street Pictures from Old Delhi
 
 The Gastronomy of the Eye, a Photographer on the Streets of Old Delhi
 A painting of Ruins, Old Delhi by Samuel Prout engraved by S Lacey for Fisher's Drawing Room Scrap Book, 1834, as an illustration to Letitia Elizabeth Landon's poem .
 A painting of Ruins, South Side of Old Delhi by Thomas Shotter Boys, engraved by G Hamilton, as an illustration to the conclusion of Letitia Elizabeth Landon's poem 

Neighbourhoods in Delhi
Central Delhi district
Tourist attractions in Delhi
History of Delhi
Former capital cities in India
Populated places established in 1639
1639 establishments in India